Laila Vakil (born 21 March 1974) is a former synchronized swimmer from Great Britain.

References 

1974 births
Living people
British synchronised swimmers
Olympic synchronised swimmers of Great Britain
Synchronized swimmers at the 1992 Summer Olympics
Commonwealth Games medallists in synchronised swimming
Commonwealth Games silver medallists for England
Synchronised swimmers at the 1994 Commonwealth Games
Medallists at the 1994 Commonwealth Games